Caroline McGowan (born February 25, 1991) is an American actress and beauty pageant titleholder from Corvallis, Oregon, who was crowned Miss Oregon 2011. She competed for the Miss America 2012 title but was not a Top 16 semi-finalist.

Pageant career

Miss Oregon 2011
In March 2011, McGowan was crowned Miss Linn-Benton County 2011. She entered the Miss Oregon pageant in late June 2011 as one of 22 qualifiers for the state title. McGowan's competition talent was a classic vocal performance of the aria "Chanson Boheme" from the opera Carmen. Her platform was "Eating Disorder Awareness: Empowerment Through Attitude".

McGowan won the competition on Saturday, July 2, 2011, when she received her crown from outgoing Miss Oregon titleholder Stephenie Steers. She earned more than $10,000 in scholarship money and other prizes from the state pageant. As Miss Oregon, her activities included public appearances across the state of Oregon.

Vying for Miss America
McGowan was Oregon's representative at the Miss America 2012 pageant in Las Vegas, Nevada, in January 2012. She was not one of the 16 semi-finalists for the national crown and earned a $3,000 non-finalist scholarship prize.

Personal life and education
McGowan was born in Des Moines, Iowa, and raised in suburban Waukee, Iowa. She is a 2009 graduate of Waukee High School. Her father is Dan McGowan and her mother is Kathy McGowan.

From 2009 through 2011, McGowan was a student at Oregon State University studying communications. After her year as Miss Oregon, McGowan transferred to Portland State University where she studied philosophy.

References

External links

Miss Oregon official website

Living people
1991 births
American beauty pageant winners
Miss America 2012 delegates
Miss Oregon winners
Oregon State University alumni
People from Corvallis, Oregon
People from Waukee, Iowa
Portland State University alumni